Jinju Stadium, is a multi-use stadium in Jinju, South Korea It is used mostly for football matches. The stadium was built in 2010 and designed for a capacity of 20,116 spectators. 
This stadium is different from the old stadium Jinju Civic Stadium.

See also 
 Jinju Civic Stadium

References

External links
Official website
Stadium information

Football venues in South Korea
Athletics (track and field) venues in South Korea
Sports venues in South Gyeongsang Province
Jinju